A warrior is a person engaged or experienced in warfare, or a figurative term for a person who shows or has shown great vigor, courage, or aggressiveness, as in politics or athletics.

Warrior or Warriors may also refer to:

Indigenous groups
 Mohawk Warrior Society (Rotisken’rakéhte) (also known as Kahnawake Warrior Society), a Mohawk First Nations group
 Tribal Warrior an Australian Aboriginal organisation based in Redfern, New South Wales

Military

Military vehicles
 American privateer Warrior, New York privateer in the War of 1812
 HMS Warrior, name of four Royal Navy ships and one shore establishment
 iRobot Warrior, robotic unmanned ground vehicle made by iRobot
 MQ-1C Warrior, unmanned aerial vehicle currently being developed by the United States Army
 OH-58D Kiowa Warrior
 Warrior (steamboat), ship used during the Black Hawk War
 Warrior tracked armoured vehicle, used by the British Army
 Warrior-class ironclad, a class of two ironclads in the Royal Navy

Other military uses 
 Cold warrior
 Land Warrior
 Urban Warrior

Other vehicles 
 Pawnee Warrior, an American helicopter design
 Piper PA-28 "Warrior", a single-engine light airplane produced by Piper Aircraft.
 Yamaha Warrior, a motorcycle

People
 Warrior, a member class of the "Tribe of Mic-O-Say" (Boy Scouts of America honor society)
 "Warrior", the initial pseudonym used by UK electronic music producer Michael Woods
 Big Warrior (died 1826), historical principal chief of the Creek Nation
Nickname given to American baseball player Paul O'Neill
 Dennis Warrior, British rugby league footballer
 The Ultimate Warrior, born Jim Hellwig and legally known as Warrior (1959–2014), American professional wrestler & motivational speaker
 The Unknown Warrior
 Warrior of Hirschlanden (Iron Age statue)
 Women warriors in literature and culture

Places

In the United States 
 Warrior, Alabama
 Black Warrior River, Alabama
 Little Warrior River, Alabama
 Locust Fork of the Black Warrior River, Alabama
 Mulberry Fork of the Black Warrior River, Alabama
 Sipsey Fork of the Black Warrior River, Alabama
 Warrior Mountain, Maryland (link also includes Warrior Ridge)
 Warriors Mark Township, Pennsylvania

Arts, entertainment, and media

Fictional characters
 Warrior, one alias of comic-book character Guy Gardner
 Warrior (character class), a character class in many print and online role-playing games

Films
 The Warriors, an alternate title for The Dark Avenger, a 1955 film
 The Warriors (film), a 1979 American film
 The Warrior (2001 British film), a British-produced film set in India, spoken entirely in Hindi, and filmed by Asif Kapadia
 The Warrior (2001 South Korean film), or Musa, a South Korean film
 Warrior (2007 film), a Chinese animation
 Warrior (2011 film), an American mixed martial arts film
 The Warrior (2015 film), a Russian mixed martial arts film
 The Warriorr (2022 film), an upcoming Indian action film
 Guerreros (English: Warriors), a 2002 Spanish film about UN Peacekeeping soldiers caught in the middle of the war in Kosovo
 A Warrior's Heart, developed under the title Warrior, a 2011 American film
 Warriors, an upcoming film based on Warriors (novel series), published under the pseudonym Erin Hunter

Games
 Warrior (arcade game), a 1979 arcade game, regarded as the first versus fighting game
 The Warriors (video game) (2005–2007), based on the 1979 film of the same name (see above)

Literature
 Warrior (Jennifer Fallon novel), a 2004 novel by Jennifer Fallon
 Warrior, a novel in the Isaac Asimov's Robots in Time series
 Warrior, a 2008 novel by Allan Mallinson
 Warriors (anthology), edited by George R. R. Martin and Gardner Dozois
 Warriors (novel series), a series of fantasy novels about cats written by several authors under the pen name Erin Hunter
 Warriors (arc), the first story arc in the series
 Warriors, a series of novels taking place in the Dragonlance realm
 The Warriors (Jakes novel), a 1977 novel by John Jakes
 The Warriors (Yurick novel), a 1965 novel by Sol Yurick

Music

Groups
 Warrior (band), an American heavy metal band
 Warrior, former name of heavy metal band Battleaxe
 Warriors (band), Yugoslav/Canadian heavy metal band

Albums
 Warrior (Kesha album), 2012
 Warrior (Scandal album), 1984
 Warrior (Unleashed album), 1997
 Warrior (EP), an EP by B.A.P
 Warrior, an EP by Foxes, 2012
 Warrior, a 1994 album by Noel Richards
 Warrior, a 2007 album by Michael Rose
 Warriors (1983 Warriors album)
 Warriors (1984 Warriors album)
 Warriors (Agnostic Front album), 2007
 Warriors (Gary Numan album), 1983
 Warriors (jazz album), a 1978 album by Don Pullen, Chico Freeman, Fred Hopkins and Bobby Battle
 Warriors (Lisa Mitchell album), 2016
 Warriorz, a 2000 album by M.O.P.

Songs and singles
 "Warrior" (B.A.P song), 2012
 "Warrior" (Disturbed song), 2011
 "Warrior" (Nelly song), 2008
 "Warrior" (Kimbra song), 2012
 "Warrior" (Kesha song), 2012
 "Warrior" (Amber Bondin song), 2014
 "Warrior" (Havana Brown song), 2013
 "Warrior" (Demi Lovato song), from their 2013 album Demi
 "Warrior" (Nina Sublatti song), 2015
 "Warrior", a song by Atreyu from their 2021 album Baptize
 "Warrior", a song by AURORA from her 2016 album All My Demons Greeting Me as a Friend
 "Warrior", a song by Dead by April from their 2017 album Worlds Collide
 "Warrior", a song by Erra from their 2014 EP Moments of Clarity
 "Warrior", a song by Impellitteri from their 1994 album Answer to the Master
 "Warrior", a song by Iron Savior from their 2002 album Condition Red
 "Warrior", a song by Matisyahu
 "Warrior", a song by Michael Woods, 2000
 "Warrior", a song by Wishbone Ash from their 1972 album Argus
 "Warriors" (Gary Numan song), a 1983 song by Gary Numan
 "Warriors" (Imagine Dragons song), 2014; official theme of the 2014 League of Legends World Championship
 "Warriors", a song by Hawkwind from their 1975 album Warrior on the Edge of Time
 "Warriors", a song by Seventh Wonder from their 2022 album The Testament
 "Warriors", a song by Warren Hue and Seori from Shang-Chi and the Legend of the Ten Rings: The Album
 "The Warrior" (song), a 1984 song by Scandal

Television

Series
 Warriors (1999 TV series), a television drama serial, directed by Peter Kosminsky
 Warriors (2009 TV series), a History Channel series hosted by Terry Schappert
 Heroes and Villains (TV series), played in the US on the Military Channel as Warriors
 Warrior (2019 TV series), an American action television series based on an original concept by Bruce Lee and produced by Cinemax

Episodes
 "The Warrior" (Stargate SG-1), an episode of Stargate SG-1
 "Warriors" (Sanctuary), an episode of Sanctuary

Other arts, entertainment, and media
 Warrior (comics), a British anthology magazine
Warrior (1982 painting), painting by American artist Jean-Michel Basquiat
 Warrior (TUGS), a fictional character from the 1988 children's television series, TUGS

Brands and enterprises
 Warriors (brand), a Malaysian corporation
 Warrior (shoes), a Chinese shoe makes
 Warrior Hotel, listed on the National Register of Historic Places in Woodbury County, Iowa
 Warrior Sports, a manufacturer of lacrosse, ice hockey and football (soccer) equipment and apparel
 Warriors, Inc., a technical adviser to Hollywood founded by Dale Dye

Sports teams

American football
 Bucharest Warriors, an American football team from Romania

Association football
 Stenhousemuir F.C., a Scottish association football club nicknamed "The Warriors"
 Warriors FC, a Singaporean association football club
 Wexford Youths F.C., an Irish association football club nicknamed the "Warriors"
 Kabwe Warriors F.C., a Zambian football club based in Kabwe that plays in the Zambian Premier League

Basketball
 Golden State Warriors, an American basketball team
 Indonesia Warriors, an Indonesian basketball club that competed in the ASEAN Basketball League
 Santa Cruz Warriors, an American basketball team
 Ulinzi Warriors, a Kenyan basketball team

Box Lacrosse
 Vancouver Warriors, professional Canadian lacrosse team in the National Lacrosse League

Cricket
 Dhaka Warriors, a Bangladeshi cricket team that competed in the Indian Cricket League
 Kurunegala Warriors, a Sri Lankan domestic T20 cricket team
 Warriors cricket team, a South African cricket team based in Port Elizabeth
 Western Australia cricket team, an Australian cricket team nicknamed the "Warriors"
 Guyana Amazon Warriors, a franchise cricket team of the Caribbean Premier League based in Providence, Georgetown, Guyana.

Ice hockey
 Sparta Warriors, a Norwegian ice hockey club

Rugby league
 Central Florida Warriors, an American rugby league team
 New Haven Warriors, a former American rugby league team
 New Zealand Warriors (formerly Auckland Warriors), a New Zealand rugby league team
 Wigan Warriors, an English rugby league team

Rugby union
 Celtic Warriors, a defunct Welsh rugby union team
 Glasgow Warriors, a Scottish rugby union team
 Helsinki Warriors, a Finnish rugby union team
 Worcester Warriors, an English rugby union team

General
 Bay City Western High School, an American high school that uses "Warriors" as the name for its sports teams
 Brother Rice High School (Michigan)
 East Gaston High School, an American high school that uses "Warriors" as the name for its sports teams
 Hawaii Warriors, the sports teams of  the University of Hawaii at Manoa
 Indiana Tech, the sports teams of the Indiana Institute of Technology
 Merrimack College, an American college that uses "Warriors" as the name for its sports teams
 Mission San Jose High School, a California high school that uses "Warriors" as the name for its sports teams
 Niskayuna High School, an American high school that uses "Warriors" as the name for its sports teams
 UE Red Warriors, the sports teams of University of the East in Manila, Philippines
 USC Warriors,  the sports teams of the University of San Carlos in Cebu City, Philippines
 Waterloo Warriors, the sports teams of the University of Waterloo in Ontario, Canada

Other uses 
 Warrior (army horse), an equine recipient of the Dickin Medal honouring the work of animals in war
 Warrior (racehorse), Australian racehorse that won the 1869 Melbourne Cup

See also 
 Ninja Warrior (disambiguation)
 Road warrior (disambiguation)
 The Warriors (disambiguation)